String girdling Earth is a mathematical puzzle with a counterintuitive solution. In a version of this puzzle, string is tightly wrapped around the equator of a perfectly spherical Earth.

Alternatively,  of string is spliced into the original string, and the extended string rearranged so that it is at a uniform height above the equator. The question that is then posed is whether the gap between string and Earth will allow the passage of a car, a cat or a thin knife blade.

Solution

As the string must be raised all along the entire  circumference, one might expect several kilometres of additional string.

In the second phrasing, considering that  is almost negligible compared with the  circumference, the first response may be that the new position of the string will be no different from the original surface-hugging position.

Even more surprising is that the size of the sphere or circle around which the string is spanned is irrelevant, and may be anything from the size of an atom to the Milky Way — the result depends only on the amount it is raised. Moreover, as in the coin-rolling problem, the shape the string girdles need not be a circle: 2 times the offset is added when it is any simple polygon or closed curve which does not intersect itself. If the shape is complex, 2 times the offset, times the absolute value of its turning number must be added.

This diagram gives a visual analogue using a square: regardless of the size of the square, the added perimeter is the sum of the four blue arcs, a circle with the same radius as the offset.

More formally, let c  be the Earth's circumference, r  its radius, Δc  the added string length and Δr  the added radius.  has a circumference of 2R ,

regardless of the value of c .

This observation also means that an athletics track has the same offset between starting lines on each lane, equal to 2 times the width of the lane, whether the circumference of the stadium is the standard  or the size of a galaxy.

See also 
 Visual calculus, an intuitive way to solve this type of problem, originally applied to finding the area of an annulus, given only its chord length
 Napkin ring problem, another problem where the radius of a sphere is counter-intuitively irrelevant

References

Length
Mathematical paradoxes